Piobesi d'Alba is a comune (municipality) in the Province of Cuneo in the Italian region Piedmont, located about  southeast of Turin and about  northeast of Cuneo.

Piobesi d'Alba borders the following municipalities: Alba, Corneliano d'Alba, and Guarene.

Demographic evolution

References

Cities and towns in Piedmont
Roero